The Treaty of Paris (formally the Treaty establishing the European Coal and Steel Community) was signed on 18 April 1951 between France, Italy, West Germany, Belgium, Luxembourg, and the Netherlands, establishing the European Coal and Steel Community (ECSC), which subsequently became part of the European Union. The treaty came into force on 23 July 1952 and expired on 23 July 2002, exactly fifty years after it came into effect.

The treaty was intended to bring diplomatic and economic stability in western Europe after the Second World War.  Some of the main enemies during the war were now sharing production of coal and steel, the key resources which previously had been central to the war effort.

The Europe Declaration, issued by the representatives of the six nations, declared that the Treaty had given birth to Europe. The Declaration emphasised that the supranational principle was the foundation of the new democratic organisation of Europe. The supranational concept was opposed by Charles de Gaulle.

EU evolution timeline

External links
 Treaty establishing the European Coal and Steel Community on Eur-Lex
 Treaties overview on EUR-Lex
 ECSC Treaty (Paris, 18 April 1951) on CVCE.eu 
 History of the European Union 1945–1957

Terminated or expired founding treaties of the European Union
Treaties concluded in 1951
Treaties entered into force in 1952
1951 in the European Economic Community
1952 in the European Economic Community
1951 in Paris
April 1951 events in Europe
Euro